Bruno Frank (born 1898, date of death unknown) was a Czech sports shooter. He competed in the team clay pigeon event at the 1924 Summer Olympics.

References

External links
 

1898 births
Year of death missing
Czech male sport shooters
Olympic shooters of Czechoslovakia
Shooters at the 1924 Summer Olympics
Place of birth missing